Pterostylis tenuicauda is a plant in the orchid family Orchidaceae and is endemic to New Caledonia. It was first formally described in 1929 by Friedrich Kraenzlin and the description was published in Vierteljahrsschrift der Naturforschenden Gesellschaft in Zurich.

References

tenuicauda
Orchids of New Caledonia
Plants described in 1998